Kawan Lovelace (born 29 June 1976) is a Belizean athlete. He competed in the men's triple jump at the 1996 Summer Olympics.

References

1976 births
Living people
Archbishop Molloy High School alumni
Athletes (track and field) at the 1996 Summer Olympics
Belizean male triple jumpers
Olympic athletes of Belize
Place of birth missing (living people)